The Uganda Development Bank Limited (UDBL) is a government-owned development bank in Uganda.

Overview
UDBL which began operating in 1972, was the first development finance institution established by the government of Uganda. The main objective of UDBL is to promote and finance development in various sectors of the economy with particular emphasis on agriculture, industry, tourism, housing, and commerce.

In June 2018, the government negotiated for a $20 million (USh 76 billion) loan from the African Development Bank to capitalize UDBL, primarily to lend to the agricultural sector for mechanization and value addition.

As of December 2021, UDBL's total assets were valued at USh 1.222 trillion (US$324.4 million). At that time, shareholders' equity was USh 1.055 trillion (US$280 million).

History
UBDL was established in 1972. The political leadership in Uganda changed in 1979, and UDBL was then able to obtain large credits from external financiers, like the African Development Bank, the International Development Association, the European Investment Bank, the European Economic Community, the Organization of Petroleum Exporting Countries, and the Arab Bank for Economic Development in Africa (Banque Arabe pour le Développement Economique en Afrique) (BADEA). With these funds, UDBL's focus shifted to financing medium and long-term projects in agriculture, manufacturing, and tourism. Between 1997 and 2001, the bank was restructured, recapitalized, and re-organized as a limited liability company, wholly owned by the government of Uganda.

Future plans
, the bank had re-organized and repositioned itself to play a larger and more visible role in Uganda's development finance. It has developed a medium-term recapitalization plan (2013-2017) that will increase shareholder's equity from the current USh 100 billion (US$40 million), to USh 500 billion (US$200 million).

Its growth plan has been streamlined to harmonize with Uganda's National Development Plan (NDP) and with Vision 2040. Vision 2040 aims to transform Ugandan society from a peasant population to a modern and prosperous country by the year 2040. Some of the development partners that UDBL is working with include the Kuwait Fund, the African Export-Import Bank, BADEA, and the Islamic Development Bank.

In June 2020, the Uganda Ministry of Finance, Planning and Economic Development, announced its intention of further increase its share capital in UDB from USh 500 billion (US$136 million) to USh 2 trillion (US$545 million). This is part of the bank's five-year strategic plan 2020–2024.

Services
UDB's services include short-term loans, medium term loans, long-term loans, equity investments, trade finance loans, and bank guarantees.

Rating
In February 2019, Fitch Ratings assigned UDB a rating of B+ (stable outlook).

Board of directors
As of August 2018, UDBL's board of directors consisted of: 1. Felix Okoboi: Chairman 2. John Byaruhanga 3. Frank Tumuheirwe: 4. Nimrod Waniala 5. Henry Balwanyi Magino 6. Silvia Angey Ufoyuru 7. Patricia Ojangole - Managing Director.

Management
As of August 2017, UDB's management team was: 1. Patricia Ojangole: Managing Director 2. Joshua Allan Mwesiga: Director, Strategy & Corporate Affairs 3. Denis Owens Ochieng: Director of Finance & Business Operations 4. Mahamoud Andama: Director Investment 5. Stephen Hamya: Chief Internal Auditor 6. Sophie Nakandi: Bank Secretary/Head Legal.

Controversy
According to a 2013 published report, an  audit by Uganda's auditor general revealed financial impropriety by board members and senior managers at UDBL, leading to financial loss. Both the board and management team involved in the fraud have been terminated and the investigation continued as of June 2014.

See also

 Banking in Uganda
 Economy of Uganda
 List of banks in Uganda
 Trade and Development Bank
 East African Development Bank
 World Bank

References

External links
 Uganda Development Bank Website
 UDB Unveils 5-Year Plans As of 3 June 2020.
  What do development banks really do?

Banks of Uganda
Government-owned companies of Uganda
Banks established in 1972
Companies based in Kampala
1972 establishments in Uganda
National development banks